The 2023 Rhode Island's 1st congressional district special election is an upcoming special election.  The seat is expected to become vacant following incumbent Democratic representative David Cicilline's announcement that he plans to resign on June 1, 2023, to become the president and CEO of the Rhode Island Foundation.

Democratic primary

Candidates

Declared 
 Sandra Cano, state senator from the 8th district (2019–present)
 Sabina Matos, Lieutenant Governor of Rhode Island (2021–present)
 Allen Waters, investment consultant, Republican nominee for this district in 2022 and for U.S. Senate in 2020

Publicly expressed interest 
 Gabe Amo, deputy director of the White House Office of Intergovernmental Affairs (2021–present)
 Dino Autiello, president of the North Providence town council
 Nick Autiello, former special advisor to former Governor of Rhode Island Gina Raimondo
 Stephanie Beauté, insurance software executive and candidate for Rhode Island Secretary of State in 2022
 Nathan Biah, state representative from the 3rd district (2021–present)
 Roberto DaSilva, mayor of East Providence (2019–present)
 Ted Donovan, progressive activist
 Dawn Euer, state senator from the 13th district (2017–present)
 John Goncalves, Providence city councilor
 Don Grebien, mayor of Pawtucket (2011–present)
 Angelica Infante, commissioner of the Rhode Island Department of Education
 Meghan Kallman, state senator from the 15th district (2021–present)
 Nirva LaFortune, former Providence city councilor and candidate for mayor of Providence in 2022
 Patrick Lynch, former Rhode Island Attorney General (2003–2011)
 Joseph Paolino III, energy consultant and son of former Providence mayor Joseph Paolino Jr
 Maria Rivera, mayor of Central Falls (2021–present)

Potential 
 Lisa Baldelli-Hunt, mayor of Woonsocket (2013–present) and former state representative from the 49th district (2007–2013)
 Liz Beretta-Perik, member of the Democratic National Committee and former treasurer of the Rhode Island Democratic Party
 Sam Bell, state senator from the 5th district (2019–present)
 Christopher Blazejewski, Majority Leader of the Rhode Island House of Representatives (2021–present) from the 2nd district (2011–present)
 Gayle Goldin, former state senator from the 3rd district (2013–2021)
 Nellie Gorbea, former Rhode Island Secretary of State (2015–2023) and candidate for Governor of Rhode Island in 2022
 Ryan Pearson, Majority Leader of the Rhode Island Senate (2023–present) from the 19th district (2013–present)
 Aaron Regunberg, former state representative from the 4th district (2015–2019) and candidate for Lieutenant Governor of Rhode Island in 2018

Declined 
 Karen Alzate, state representative from the 60th district (2019–present)
 Gregg Amore, Rhode Island Secretary of State (2023–present)
 James Diossa, Rhode Island General Treasurer (2023–present)
 Louis DiPalma, state senator from the 12th district (2009–present)
 Brendan Doherty, former Superintendent of the Rhode Island State Police and Republican nominee for this district in 2012
 Jorge Elorza, former mayor of Providence (2015–2023)
 Helena Foulkes, corporate executive and candidate for Governor of Rhode Island in 2022
 Katherine Kazarian, state representative from the 63rd district (2013–present)
 Xay Khamsyvoravong, mayor of Newport
 Valarie Lawson, state senator from the 14th district (2019–present)
 Dan McKee, Governor of Rhode Island (2021–present)
 Cynthia Mendes, former state senator from the 8th district (2021–2023) and candidate for Lieutenant Governor of Rhode Island in 2022
 Jeff Mutter, mayor of Cumberland
 Peter Neronha, Rhode Island Attorney General (2019–present)
 Joseph Paolino Jr, former U.S. Ambassador to Malta (1994–1996) and former mayor of Providence (1984–1991)
 Clay Pell, lawyer, former Deputy Assistant Secretary of Education, and candidate for Governor of Rhode Island in 2014
 Gina Raimondo, U.S. Secretary of Commerce (2021–present) and former Governor of Rhode Island (2015–2021)
 Joe Shekarchi, Speaker of the Rhode Island House of Representatives (2021–present)
 Brett Smiley, mayor of Providence (2023–present)
 Angel Taveras, former mayor of Providence (2011–2015) and candidate for Governor of Rhode Island in 2014

Republican primary

Candidates

Publicly expressed interest 
 Aaron Guckian, fundraising consultant, former aide to then-governor Donald Carcieri, and nominee for Lieutenant Governor of Rhode Island in 2022
 Dana Traversie, cybersecurity analyst

Potential 
 Jessica de la Cruz, Minority Leader of the Rhode Island Senate (2022–present) from the 23rd district (2021–present)
 Barbara Ann Fenton-Fung, state representative from the 15th district (2021–present)

Declined 
 Robert Flanders, former Associate Justice of the Rhode Island Supreme Court (1996–2004) and nominee for U.S. Senate in 2018
 John Loughlin, former state representative from the 71st district (2005–2010) and nominee for this district in 2010
 Brian Newberry, state representative from the 48th district (2009–present) and former RI House Minority Leader (2011–2017)

General election

Predictions

See also
2023 United States House of Representatives elections
118th United States Congress
List of special elections to the United States House of Representatives

References 

Rhode Island 2023 1
Rhode Island 2023 1
2023 1 Special
Rhode Island 1 Special
United States House of Representatives 1 Special
United States House of Representatives 2023 4